Palosaari is a Finnish surname. Notable people with the surname include:

Esa Palosaari (born 1968), Finnish ice hockey player
Jim Palosaari (1939–2011), American evangelist and performer

See also
Pulosari (disambiguation)

Finnish-language surnames